Hussainpur is a census town in Jalandhar district in the Indian state of Punjab. It is situated in Jalandhar II Tehsil. The village code is 030405.

Demographics
According to Census 2011 information the location code or village code of Hussainpur village is 030406. Hussainpur village is located in Jalandhar Ii Tehsil of Jalandhar district in Punjab, India. It is situated 15km away from sub-district headquarter Jalandhar - Ii and 15km away from district headquarter Jalandhar. As per 2009 stats, Hussainpur village is also a gram panchayat.

The total geographical area of village is 119 hectares. Hussainpur has a total population of 1,291 peoples. There are about 283 houses in Hussainpur village. Jalandhar is nearest town to Hussainpur.

See also
Lehmber Hussainpuri

References

Cities and towns in Jalandhar district